The National Dance Council of America (NDCA) is an organisation formed in 1948 which set standards for ballroom dance teachers, and competitions similar to the Imperial Society of Teachers of Dancing (ISTD) founded 1904 in London.

Description
The National Dance Council of America, (NDCA) – is the Official Governing Council of Dance and Dancesport in the United States of America. With 17 Member Organizations encompassing more than 25,000 dance professionals and over 110 sanctioned competitions and championships, it is the leading authority of dance for Professionals, Amateurs and Pro/Am Competitors.

References

External links
Official Website

Ballroom dance
Dance in the United States
Dance education organizations
Performing arts education in the United States
Educational charities based in the United States
1948 establishments in the United States
Organizations established in 1948